City Utilities of Springfield (CU) is a community-owned utility serving southwest Missouri with electricity, natural gas, water, telecommunications and transit services.  CU provides service to over 106,000 customers.

CU is responsible for the generation, transmission, and distribution of electric power; the acquisition, transportation, and distribution of natural gas; and the acquisition, treatment, and distribution of water; plus the operation of the bus transportation system.

The utility is owned by the community and governed by an eleven-member Board of Public Utilities, nine of whom are customers inside the city limits and two who reside outside the city limits.  Board members are appointed by City Council for three-year terms.  The Board normally meets on the last Thursday of each month. The Board makes policy decisions for CU and appoints the General Manager, who is the Chief Executive Officer. The City of Springfield acquired the former Missouri Gas and Electric from Federal Light and Traction, an affiliate of Cities Service, in 1945.

References

External links
Official website
CU Transit Services

Municipal electric utilities of the United States
Water companies of the United States
Springfield, Missouri
Transit agencies in Missouri
Bus transportation in Missouri